Sharko is a Belgian indie pop-rock band. Sharko may also refer to
Sharko (surname)
Sharko Shower, a French medical device
Zig & Sharko, a French animated series
Sharko-Bakumovka, a village in Voronezh Oblast, Russia

See also
Charcot (disambiguation)